Johannes Henricus J. Te Maarssen (born September 3, 1933 in Groenlo) is a Dutch clergyman and bishop for the Roman Catholic Diocese of Kundiawa. He was appointed bishop in 2000. He retired in 2009.

See also
Catholic Church in the Netherlands

References

1933 births
Dutch Roman Catholic bishops
Roman Catholic bishops of Kundiawa
Living people